Kresnik is a literary award in Slovenia awarded each year for the best novel in Slovene of the previous year. It has been bestowed since 1991 at summer solstice by the national newspaper house Delo. The awards ceremony is normally held on Rožnik Hill above Ljubljana where the winner is invited to light a large bonfire. The winner also receives a financial award.

References

External links
 Kresnik Award on the Slovenia Cultural Profiles Project site, a Ministry of Culture of Slovenia and British Council Slovenia joint project

 
Slovenian literary awards
Awards established in 1991
1991 establishments in Slovenia